Schladen is a village and a former municipality in the district of Wolfenbüttel, in Lower Saxony, Germany. Since 1 November 2013, it is part of the municipality Schladen-Werla. It is situated on the river Oker, approx. 15 km south of Wolfenbüttel, and 25 km south of Braunschweig.

Schladen was the seat of the former Samtgemeinde ("collective municipality") Schladen. The German neoclassicist architect, painter and writer Leo von Klenze was born in Schladen on February 29, 1784.

References

Wolfenbüttel (district)
Former municipalities in Lower Saxony